Gaston County Schools is a public school district located in Gaston County, North Carolina. With 30,046 students enrolled in 56 schools as of the 2021–22 academic year, it is the tenth largest public school district in North Carolina.

Schools
The system is made up of 56 schools: 11 high schools, 11 middle schools, 32 elementary schools, and three special schools including the district's Gaston Virtual Academy.

School directory

High schools (9–12)
Ashbrook High School, Gastonia
Bessemer City High School, Bessemer City
Cherryville High School, Cherryville
East Gaston High School, Mount Holly
Forestview High School, Gastonia
Gaston Early College High School, Dallas
Gaston Early College of Medical Sciences High School, Dallas
Highland School of Technology, Gastonia
Hunter Huss High School, Gastonia
North Gaston High School, Dallas
South Point High School, Belmont
Stuart W. Cramer High School, Belmont

Middle schools (6–8)
Southwest Middle School, Gastonia 
W. P. Grier Middle School, Gastonia 
York Chester Middle School, Gastonia 
Belmont Middle School, Belmont 
Bessemer City Middle School, Bessemer City 
Cramerton Middle School, Cramerton 
John Chavis Middle School, Cherryville 
W. C. Friday Middle School, Dallas 
Holbrook Middle School, Lowell 
Mount Holly Middle School, Mount Holly 
Stanley Middle School Stanley

Elementary schools
Brookside Elementary School
Sadler Elementary School
Chapel Grove Elementary School
Gardner Park Elementary School
Hawks Nest STEAM Academy
Lingerfeldt Elementary School
New Hope Elementary School
Pleasant Ridge Elementary School
Robinson Elementary School
Sherwood Elementary School
Woodhill Elementary School
H.H. Beam Elementary School
W.A. Bess Elementary School
Belmont Central Elementary School
Catawba Heights Elementary School
Page Primary School
North Belmont Elementary School
Bessemer City Central Elementary School
Bessemer City Primary School
Tryon Elementary School
Beam Intermediate School
Cherryville Elementary School
Carr Elementary School
Costner Elementary School
 Lowell Elementary School
McAdenville Elementary School
Pinewood Elementary School
Rankin Elementary School
Kiser Elementary School
Springfield Elementary School

Special schools
Gaston Virtual Academy (K-12)
Warlick Academy
Webb St. School

References

 

School districts in North Carolina
Education in Gaston County, North Carolina